Shirley Leon Quimby (August 21, 1893 – May 15, 1986) was an American  physicist.
He graduated from University of California at Berkeley in 1915 and received his PhD in physics at Columbia University in 1925. He served as a professor at Columbia from 1943 and became professor emeritus in 1962.
In 1915 he married fellow student Edith Hinkley, who would later be noted for her contributions to nuclear medicine and radiology.

References

External links

Finding aid to the Shirley Leon Quimby Papers at Columbia University. Rare Book & Manuscript Library

American physicists
20th-century American physicists
1893 births
1986 deaths
People from San Francisco
Scientists from California
University of California, Berkeley alumni
Columbia Graduate School of Arts and Sciences alumni
Columbia University faculty
Fellows of the American Physical Society
Recipients of the Legion of Merit
Members of the New York Yacht Club